Igor Sjunin (born 4 December 1990) is an Estonian triple jumper.

Personal bests
Triple jump 16.86
Long jump 7.59

Achievements

References

1990 births
Living people
Estonian male triple jumpers
Estonian male long jumpers
Competitors at the 2011 Summer Universiade
Competitors at the 2013 Summer Universiade
Competitors at the 2015 Summer Universiade